Oskar Jan Nowak (born 2 February 2001) is a Polish professional footballer who plays as a left-back for Sokół Kleczew.

Club career
Born in Poznań, Nowak joined Lech Poznań's youth setup in 2014, from Warta Poznań. He made his senior debut with the former's reserves during the 2017–18 season, in the II liga.

In July 2019, Nowak moved to fellow third division side Błękitni Stargard. The following year, on 4 February, he joined I Liga side Wigry Suwałki.

Nowak made his professional debut on 28 June 2020, starting in a 2–4 home loss against GKS Bełchatów. On 26 August, after five appearances, he agreed to a contract with Spanish La Liga side Getafe CF, being initially assigned to the B-team.

On 29 January 2021 Nowak returned to Poland and joined Chojniczanka Chojnice. On 10 September 2021, shortly after terminating his contract with Chojniczanka, he moved to a fourth division side Sokół Kleczew.

References

External links

2001 births
Living people
Footballers from Poznań
Polish footballers
Association football defenders
I liga players
II liga players
III liga players
Lech Poznań II players
Lech Poznań players
Błękitni Stargard players
Wigry Suwałki players
Getafe CF B players
Chojniczanka Chojnice players
Poland youth international footballers
Polish expatriate footballers
Polish expatriate sportspeople in Spain
Expatriate footballers in Spain